Henry Delves may refer to:

Henry Delves (politician), MP for Cheshire (UK Parliament constituency)
Sir Henry Delves, 2nd Baronet (1597–1663), of the Delves baronets, High Sheriff of Cheshire

See also
Delves (disambiguation)